The Hubert Evans Non-Fiction Prize, established in 1985, is awarded annually as the BC Book Prize for the best non-fiction book by a resident of British Columbia, Canada. The prize is named after the Canadian novelist Hubert Evans (1892-1986).

Winners and finalists

References

External links
Hubert Evans Non-Fiction Prize
BC Book Prizes

BC and Yukon Book Prizes
Canadian non-fiction literary awards
1985 establishments in British Columbia
Awards established in 1985